Richard Ball Spencer (also, incorrectly, Richard Barnett Spencer) was a British marine painter, active from 1840 to 1874.

A son William Ball Spencer (1854-1923) (sometimes, incorrectly known as, Richard Barnett Spencer) also became active as a ship portraitist.

References

 
 Bonhams

19th-century English painters
English male painters
1812 births
1897 deaths
19th-century English male artists